Marie-Pierre Lamarche (born 20 October 1968) is a Canadian speed skater. She competed in the women's 1000 metres at the 1988 Winter Olympics.

References

External links
 

1968 births
Living people
Canadian female speed skaters
Olympic speed skaters of Canada
Speed skaters at the 1988 Winter Olympics
Speed skaters from Quebec City
Laval Rouge et Or athletes